Paul Castle (1955/56 – 17 November 2010) was a British property developer.

Career
Castle owned The Goose, a Michelin–starred restaurant in Britwell Salome, near Watlington, Oxfordshire, but this had closed before his death due to financial losses.

Castle owned a private plane, Ferrari and Bentley motorcars, and property in Switzerland, France, London and Berkshire.

Death
On 17 November 2010, Castle jumped to his death in front of a London Underground train at Bond Street tube station. He was "said to be experiencing severe difficulties with his multi-million pound empire". Castle had "long-standing heart problems".

Personal life
Castle had two children, and at the time of his death was to have been married for a fourth time, to Natalie Theo, a former fashion editor.

Castle was a keen polo player, and owned the Metropolitan polo team.

References

2010 suicides
British real estate businesspeople
1950s births
British polo players
Suicides by train
Suicides in Westminster